Jeremy Williams (born 19 January 1979) was an English cricketer. He was a right-handed batsman and wicket-keeper who played for Devon. He was born in Plymouth.

Williams, who played in the Minor Counties Championship for the team between 1998 and 2003, made two List A appearances, between 2001 and 2002.

Williams made a top score of 40 runs, in his debut List A appearance.

Williams last season was 2015-16 appearance was for his local club side.

External links
Jeremy Williams at Cricket Archive 

1979 births
Living people
English cricketers
Devon cricketers
Wicket-keepers